Ammi-Saduqa (or Ammisaduqa, Ammizaduga) was a king, c. 1646–1626 BC according to the Middle Chronology dating, (or c. 1582–1562 according to the Short Chronology), of the First Dynasty of Babylon. Some twenty-one year-names survive for his reign, including the first seventeen. The names indicate that these years were fairly peaceful ones for the kingdom of Ammi-Saduqa, who was primarily engaged in enriching and enlarging the temples, and a few other building projects, such as building a wall at the mouth of the Euphrates in his eleventh regnal year.

See also
 Kings of Babylon 
 Venus tablets of Ammisaduqa

References

17th-century BC Babylonian kings
First dynasty of Babylon